Ethan Kwame Colm Raymond Ampadu (born 14 September 2000) is a professional footballer who plays as a centre back or defensive midfielder for Serie A club Spezia, on loan from Chelsea, and the Wales national team.

Ampadu previously played for Exeter City, where he became the youngest player to appear for the club's first team, aged 15. He has also played for German club RB Leipzig and English club Sheffield United on loan.

Ampadu is a Welsh international footballer. After playing for England at under-16 level, he played for Wales at under-16, under-17 and under-19 level, before making his senior debut for Wales in November 2017. He was part of the Wales squad that reached the round of 16 at UEFA Euro 2020. He was part of the first Welsh squad to qualify for a FIFA World Cup since 1958.

Club career

Exeter City
Born in Exeter, Devon, Ampadu is the son of former professional footballer Kwame Ampadu. A product of the Exeter City youth academy, appearing for the under-18 squad at the age of 14, he made his senior debut – aged  – in an EFL Cup first round match against Brentford at St James Park on 9 August 2016, playing the full 120 minutes of a 1–0 victory. He became the club's youngest ever player, breaking an 87-year-old record set by Cliff Bastin, and being named man of the match. Ampadu's record was beaten by Ben Chrisene in August 2019. A week later, he made his league debut in a 1–0 home defeat against Crawley Town in EFL League Two.

Chelsea

On 1 July 2017, Ampadu signed a contract with Premier League club Chelsea. The two clubs had entered negotiations over a compensation fee for the player in an attempt to reach a fee that both found acceptable for the then 16-year-old. Yet, in November 2017, Exeter City chairman Julian Tagg said that, whilst there was still a positive relationship between the two clubs, there was also a "massive disparity" in both clubs' valuation of the player. It was set to go to a tribunal.

On 20 September 2017, Ampadu made his debut for Chelsea in an EFL Cup third round match against Nottingham Forest, coming on in the 55th minute for Cesc Fàbregas. Doing so made him the first player born in the 2000s to play for the Chelsea senior team. At 17 years and six days old, he also became the youngest player to debut for the club in over ten years. On 12 December 2017, he made his Premier League debut for Chelsea, coming on as a substitute against Huddersfield Town in the 80th minute.

In September 2018 he signed a new five-year contract with Chelsea.

In July 2019, new manager Frank Lampard confirmed that Ampadu would spend the 2019–20 season out on loan at another club. In that period, Ampadu joined RB Leipzig on a season-long loan deal.

On 7 September 2020, Ampadu joined fellow Premier League club Sheffield United on a season-long loan. He played 29 games in all competitions for the Blades, who were relegated.

On 31 August 2021, Ampadu joined Italian side, Venezia on a season-long loan after signing a new three-year deal with Chelsea.

On 1 September 2022, Ampadu joined Spezia on a season-long loan.

International career
Ampadu plays internationally for the Wales national football team. He qualifies for Wales through his Welsh mother. He was previously also eligible to represent England, Republic of Ireland and Ghana.

On 26 May 2017, at the age of 16, Ampadu was called into the senior Wales squad ahead of their World Cup qualifier with Serbia. He was called up again on 1 November 2017 for friendlies against France and Panama, and made his debut aged 17 on 10 November 2017 against France at the Stade de France, coming on as a 63rd-minute substitute for Joe Ledley in a 2–0 defeat.

In May 2021, Ampadu was selected for the Wales squad for the delayed UEFA Euro 2020 tournament. On 20 June, in the 55th-minute of Wales' 1–0 defeat to Italy, he received a straight red card for a late challenge on Federico Bernardeschi, becoming the youngest player to receive one at the European Championships. In November 2022 he was named in the Wales squad for the 2022 FIFA World Cup in Qatar.

Career statistics

Club

International

Honours
Chelsea
UEFA Europa League: 2018–19

References

External links

2000 births
Living people
Sportspeople from Exeter
Footballers from Devon
Welsh footballers
Wales youth international footballers
Wales international footballers
English footballers
England youth international footballers
Association football midfielders
Exeter City F.C. players
Chelsea F.C. players
RB Leipzig players
Sheffield United F.C. players
Venezia F.C. players
Spezia Calcio players
Premier League players
English Football League players
Bundesliga players
Serie A players
UEFA Euro 2020 players
2022 FIFA World Cup players
Welsh expatriate footballers
Welsh expatriate sportspeople in Germany
Welsh expatriate sportspeople in Italy
Expatriate footballers in Germany
Expatriate footballers in Italy
Black British sportsmen
English sportspeople of Ghanaian descent
English people of Irish descent
English people of Welsh descent
British sportspeople of Ghanaian descent
Welsh people of Ghanaian descent
Welsh people of Irish descent
UEFA Europa League winning players